Koro may refer to:

Geography
Koro Island, a Fijian island
Koro Sea, in the Pacific Ocean
Koro, Ivory Coast
Koro, Mali
Koro, Wisconsin, United States, an unincorporated community

Languages

Koro language (India), an endangered language spoken in Arunachal Pradesh, India
Koro language (New Guinea)
Koro language (Vanuatu)
Koro, a variety of the Maninka language spoken in Ivory Coast

Polynesian culture
'Oro, a god in Polynesian mythology
Koro (literally, "grandfather"), a term of respect in the Māori language for a male Kaumātua (tribal elder)

Other uses
Kōrō, a masculine Japanese given name
KORO, a Spanish-language television station in Corpus Christi, Texas, USA
Koro (incense burner), a Japanese incense burner
Koro (medicine), the syndrome in which someone believes their external genitals are retracting
Koro Wachi language, spoken in Nigeria
Musiliu Obanikoro, popularly known as Koro
Nkoroo language, Nigeria